Julius Hopp (18 May 1819 – 28 August 1885) was an Austrian composer, conductor, arranger and translator.

Life and career 
Born in Graz, Empire of Austria, the son of the actor and poet Friedrich Hopp, Lucius became known in the 1860s and 1870s through his adaptations of Jacques Offenbach's operettas, which were mainly performed in the Theater an der Wien, where Hopp was Kapellmeister. He composed parodies, antics and folk plays and appeared as a translator of French operas and operettas. In particular Hopp's sparkling adaptations of the operettas of Jacques Offenbach (1819-1880) ensured the success of these works on Viennese soil and brought riches to theatre entrepreneurs whereby Hopp, due to his modesty, but not entirely through his own fault, did not enjoy that shower of gold.

Of Hopp's own works - despite their richness of melody - Das Donauweibchen and Morilla were only moderate successes. "Margaret and Mitten," on the other hand, had countless performances.

As the last of his theatre performances Hopp worked at the Theater in der Josefstadt until 1880. After he had become hard of hearing and unable to work at that time, the days of naked misery came for him.

Work 

 Oesterreichs Flüsse (libretto: Carl Paul), allegorical festival, UA 1854
 Der Bräutigam in Hemdärmeln oder Vetter Fritz (libretto: Karl Julius), Posse mit Gesang, UA 1854
 Eine Vorstadt-G'schicht'  (libretto: O. F. Berg), Life picture with singing and dancing, UA 1858
 Ein Wiener Kind (libretto: Therese Megerle), Folk play with singing, UA 1858
 Bruder und Brüderln (libretto: Karl Stein), Character portrait with singing and dancing, UA 1858
 Im Dorf (libretto: Therese Megerle), Rural character painting with song and dance, UA 1858
 Ein gebrochenes Wort (Das Erbtheil der Waise) (libretto: Therese Megerle), play with singing and dancing, UA 1859
 Zwei Mann von Heß (libretto: Anton Langer), Original life picture with singing, UA 1860
 Anna die schöne Kellnerin (libretto: H. Riedl), Character portrait with singing and dancing, UA 1860
 Fesche Geister von anno dazumal (Das Kind des Regiments) (libretto: O. F. Berg), popular work with singing, UA 1862
 Margrethl/Margarethl und Fäustling ... (own libretto), parodistic burlesque with music and dance, UA 1862
 Ein Deutschmeister (libretto: Karl Swiedack), operetta, UA 1863
 Auroras Geheimniß (libretto: Julius Megerle), Character painting with singing, dancing and ghostly apparitions, UA 1863
 Eine leichte Person (libretto: O. F. Berg), Posse, UA 1863
 Er nimmt auf seine Frau Geld auf (Libretto: Franz Biringer), Singspiel mit Tanz, UA 1864
 Herr Arthur Gareißl (libretto von A. Bahn), Posse mit Gesang, UA 1864
 Der halbe Mensch (libretto: O. F. Berg), Image of the people's life, UA 1864
 Der Postillion von Langenlois libretto: Julius Bittner), burlesque Posse mit Gesang, UA 1864
 Ein Wiener Findelkind<ref>Die fesche Godl: Skizzen aus dem Wiener Volksleben mit Gesang in drei Abtheilungen und sechs Bildern on WorldCat<ref> (libretto: Therese Megerle), pictures from popular life mit Gesang, UA 1864
 Die fesche Godel (libretto: Ferdinand Heim), sketches from the folk life with singing, UA 1865
 Das Donauweibchen und der Ritter vom Kahlenberg (libretto: J. Hopp and Paul Krone), romantic-comic operetta, 1866
 Auf einem Vulkan (libretto: Alois Berla), Charakterbild mit Gesang, UA 1867
 Der Freischütz (own libretto), Posse mit Gesang und Tanz, UA 1867
 Morilla (own libretto), Operetta, UA 1868
 Gräfin Pepi oder: Zwei bekannte Persönlichkeiten (libretto after Gräfin Guste by David Kalisch), Posse in one act, UA 1871
 Hamlet (own libretto), comic-parodic operetta, UA 1874

References

External links 
 
 

Austrian composers
Austrian operetta composers
Austrian male dramatists and playwrights
Austrian librettists
1819 births
1885 deaths
Musicians from Graz
19th-century Austrian dramatists and playwrights
19th-century Austrian male writers